Jouni Kaitainen (born June 9, 1980) is a Finnish nordic combined skier who has competed since 1999. He won a bronze medal in the 4 x 5 km team event at the 2003 FIS Nordic World Ski Championships in Val di Fiemme and finished 19th in the 15 km individual at those same championships.

Kaitainen's best individual career finish was second in Austria in 1999 in the 15 km individual event.

External links

1980 births
Living people
Finnish male Nordic combined skiers
FIS Nordic World Ski Championships medalists in Nordic combined
21st-century Finnish people